Chitra Iyer (also credited as Chitra Sivaraman) is an Indian playback singer who has worked in Indian and Italian films across five different industries primarily in Malayalam.

A resident of Bangalore, Chitra worked extensively with A. R. Rahman during the early 2000s on his Tamil films, while also having an alternate career as a television host and actress on Malayalam television.

Career
Early in her career, Chitra Iyer attempted to reach out to composer A. R. Rahman to work with him, but found it difficult as she was based out of Bangalore. In 2000, Rahman initiated contact with Chitra and invited her to come to Chennai with a demo cassette of her work, with Chitra recording a series of Tamil and Malayalam songs. On the day of her visit to Chennai, Rahman immediately heard the songs and hired her to record for the song "Athini Sithini" for the film Thenali (2000) during the same evening. She subsequently continued to work for other composers in Tamil cinema including Karthik Raja, Yuvan Shankar Raja, Bharadwaj and Vidyasagar under her post-marriage name of Chitra Sivaraman. Furthermore, apart from in her mother tongue of Tamil, Chitra continued to sing playback for Telugu, Kannada, Malayalam and Hindi films.

In the Malayalam entertainment industry, she had an alternate career as an anchor of a Malayalam singing show, Jeeva's Sapta Swarangal and hosted it under her maiden name, Chitra Iyer. Having done her education in Kerala, she had a good foundation in the Malayalam language, with her work on the show leading to further opportunities to sing for films.

Personal life
Chitra Iyer is married to former Air Force pilot Vinod Sivaraman since 12 July 1989. The pair met at the insistence of their parents at Chennai Gymkhana Club in early 1989, and have since had two daughters Aditi and Anjali. Anjali is known for her performance in the 2023 Netflix series Class.

In recent years, alongside her television commitments, Chitra has worked as the founder and trustee of the Society for Elephant Welfare in Kerala. She has also promoted farming with the state, supporting a project launched by her mother Rohini Iyer. Likewise, she launched a software company, Darkhorse Productions, in 2013 alongside her daughters Aditi and Anjali Sivaraman.

Notable discography
Tamil

Malayalam

Television
Sapthaswarangal (Asianet) as Host
Idea Star singer 2006 (Asianet) as Judge
Voice of Kerala (Surya TV) as Judge
Sangeetha Mahayudham (Surya TV) as Team Captain
Malayalee House (Surya TV) as Contestant
Super Star Global (Amrita TV) as Judge
Flowers Oru Kodi (Flowers TV) as Contestant

 Other TV Shows as guest
 JB Junction
 Onnum Onnum Moonu
 Symphony
 Ente Daivam
 Tharapakittu
 Annonyam
 Tarang
 Thara Dambathimarude Samsthana Sammelanam

She has also performed in a few Mauritius Television shows as Performer
TV serials - Malayalam

Filmography
2005 -  Athira X C (Malayalam) - telefilm
2007 - Rathri Mazha (Malayalam) as Mohini Natyamandir
2009 - Makante Achan (Malayalam) as herself
2010 - Kaaryasthan (Malayalam) as herself
2011 - Makaramanju (Malayalam) as Rukku Bai
2012 - Casanovva (Malayalam) as Salsa Teacher
2012 - Unnam (Malayalam) as Padma
2012 - Arike (Malayalam) as Kalpan's chitta
2018 - B.Tech (Malayalam) as Priya's mother
2021 - Mohan Kumar Fans as herself
2022 - Jana Gana Mana as Swetha Gupta
2022 - Meri Awas Suno as Prof. Renuka Varma

References

External links

Living people
Indian women playback singers
Tamil playback singers
Kannada playback singers
Telugu playback singers
Singers from Chennai
Tamil singers
21st-century Indian women singers
21st-century Indian singers
Women musicians from Tamil Nadu
Year of birth missing (living people)
Actresses in Malayalam television
Actresses in Malayalam cinema